David Carlyle Ashman (October 13, 1932 – July 20, 1984) was an American male weightlifter, who competed in the heavyweight class and represented United States at international competitions.

He won the silver medal at the 1958 World Weightlifting Championships in the +90 kg category, losing to Russian Alexei Medvedev of the Soviet Union. Ashman, then 25, held a full-time job as an accountant in his hometown of Norwood, Massachusetts at the time.

Ashman later moved to York, Pennsylvania to train with the York Barbell Club and shortly after that to California to join the Culver City Westside Barbell Club. He temporarily held the world record in both the snatch and clean-and-jerk category. He set the clean-and-jerk record of  during an exhibition on May 14, 1960, at the Junior National AAU championships, breaking Soviet Yuri Vlasov's previous record by 8 lbs. The following month, he was named an alternate to the U.S. Olympic team.

References

1932 births
1984 deaths
American accountants
American male weightlifters
World Weightlifting Championships medalists
Weightlifters at the 1959 Pan American Games
Pan American Games medalists in weightlifting
Pan American Games gold medalists for the United States
World record setters in weightlifting
Medalists at the 1959 Pan American Games
20th-century American people